Leptura longipennis is an extinct species, that is included to incertae sedis of the Lepturinae subfamily in long-horned beetle family. It was found in Rott (Germany, Rhineland).

References

Lepturinae
Beetles described in 1938